Jelle Snippe (born 19 September 1998) is a Dutch judoka.

He is the bronze medallist of the 2017 Judo Grand Prix The Hague in the -100 kg.

On 12 November 2022 he won a silver medal at the 2022 European Mixed Team Judo Championships as part of team Netherlands.

References

External links
 

1998 births
Living people
Dutch male judoka
Sportspeople from Enschede
20th-century Dutch people
21st-century Dutch people